{{Automatic taxobox
| taxon = Caryospora (alveolate)
| authority = Leger, 1904
| subdivision_ranks = Species
| subdivision =
Caryospora ahaetullae
Caryospora aquilae
Caryospora arcayae
Caryospora argentati
Caryospora barnardae
Caryospora bengalensis
Caryospora biarmicusis
Caryospora bigenetica
Caryospora bothriechis
Caryospora brasiliensis
Caryospora brygooi
Caryospora bubonis
Caryospora carajasensis 
Caryospora cheloniae
Caryospora choctawensis
Caryospora circi
Caryospora cobrae
Caryospora colubris
Caryospora coniophanis
Caryospora conophae
Caryospora constancieae
Caryospora corallae
Caryospora demansiae
Caryospora dendrelaphis
Caryospora durelli
Caryospora duszynskii
Caryospora epicrati
Caryospora ernsti
Caryospora falconis
Caryospora gekkonis
Caryospora gloriae
Caryospora gracilis
Caryospora guatemalensis
Caryospora heterodermus
Caryospora henryae
Caryospora hermae
Caryospora japonicum
Caryospora jararacae
Caryospora jiroveci
Caryospora kalimantanensis
Caryospora kansasensis
Caryospora kutzeri
Caryospora lampropeltis
Caryospora legeri
Caryospora lindsayi
Caryospora maculatus
Caryospora madagascariensis
Caryospora masticophis
Caryospora matatu
Caryospora maximaCaryospora mayorumCaryospora micruriCaryospora minutaCaryospora najadaeCaryospora neofalconisCaryospora paraensisCaryospora peruensisCaryospora psammophiCaryospora pseustesi Caryospora regentensisCaryospora relictaeCaryospora saudiarabiensisCaryospora schokariensisCaryospora serpentisCaryospora simplexCaryospora strigisCaryospora tantillaeCaryospora telescopisCaryospora tremulaCaryospora undataCaryospora uptoniCaryospora varaniornatiCaryospora veselyiCaryospora vipraeCaryospora weyeareCaryospora zacapensisCaryospora zuckermanae}}Caryospora is a genus of parasitic protozoa in the phylum Apicomplexa. The species in this genus infect birds and reptiles with the majority of described species infecting snakes. It is the third largest genus in the family Eimeriidae.

Despite the number of species in this genus, it has not been much studied.

History

This genus was created by Leger in 1904. The name was originally Karyospora but this was changed by Leger in 1911.

Taxonomy

Although this genus is usually placed in the family Eimeriidae, it may actually be more closely related to the family Lankesterellidae.

There are at least 70 species in this genus.

Life cycle

This genus is characterised by monosporocystic octozoitic oocytes. Species in this genus infect the digestive tract of reptiles and birds. Some species may also infect small rodents which are normally prey of the reptile or bird species.

Host records

SnakesC. ahaetullae - Long nosed vine snake (Ahaetulla nasuta), Oriental whipsnake (Ahaetulla prasina)C. barnardae - Malagasy colubrid (Liopholidophis stumpffi)C. bengalensis - Rainbow water snake (Enhydris enhydris)C. bigenetica - Timber rattlesnake (Crotalus horridus)C. bothriechis - Guatemalan palm viper (Bothriechis aurifer)C. brygooi -  Madagascar cat eye snake (Madagascarophis colubrinus)C. brasiliensis - Nuazo (Leimadophis poecilogyrus schotti), Brazilian green racer (Philodryas aestivus), Culebra (Philodryas nattarei), Mboi-obi (Philodryas olfersi)C. carajasensis - False coral (Oxyrhopus petola digitalis)C. choctawensis - Flathead snake (Tantilla gracilis)C. cobrae - Indian cobra (Naja naja)C. colubris - Dwarf colubrid (Eirenis decemlineata), Horseshoe snake (Hemorrhois hippocrepis), Large whip snake (Hierophis jugularis), Western whip snake (Hierophis viridiflavus)C. coniophanis - Black striped snake (Coniophanes imperialis)C. conophae - Road guarder snake (Conophis lineatus)C. constancieae - Amazonian coral snake (Micrurus spixii spixii)C. corallae - Emerald tree boa (Corallus caninus) C. demansiae - Yellow faced whip snake (Demansia psammophis)C. dendrelaphis - Common tree snake (Dendrelaphis punctulatus)C. durelli - Round Island boa (Casarea dussumieri)C. duszynskii - Corn snake (Elaphe guttata guttata), Red corn snake (Elaphe guttata emoryi), Texas rat snake (Elaphe obsoleta lindheimeri), Black rat snake (Elaphe obsoleta obsoleta) Prairie kingsnake (Lampropeltis calligaster calligaster)C. epicrati - Rainbow boa (Epicrates cenchria cenchria)C. gracilis - Flat headed snake (Tantilla gracilis)C. guatemalensis - Milk snake (Lampropeltis triangulum)C. hermae - Boaedon fuligenosus, Western striped sand snake (Psammophis phillipsi)C. heterodermus - Variable green snake (Philothamnus heterodermus)C. japonicum - Tiger keelback (Rhabdophis tigrinus)C. jararacae - Coffee palm viper (Bothriechis lateralis), Fer-de-lance (Bothrops atrox),  Jararaca (Bothrops jararaca)C. kalimantanensis - Mangrove snake (Boiga dendrophila)C. lampropeltis - Prairie kingsnake (Lampropeltis calligaster), Eastern kingsnake (Lampropeltis getula), Milk snake (Lampropeltis triangulum)C. legeri - Sand snake (Psammophis sibilans sibilans)C. maculatus - Spotted night adder (Causus maculatus)C. madagascariensis - Madagascar cat eye snake (Madagascarophis colubrinus), Malagasy colubrid (Mimophis mahfalensis)C. masticophis - Eastern racer (Coluber constrictor), Masticophis flagellumC. matatu - Horned bush viper (Atheris ceratophorus)C. maxima - Saw scaled viper (Echis carinatus)C. mayorum - Road guarder snake (Conophis lineatus)C. micruri - Amazonian coral snake (Micrurus spixii spixii)C. minuta - Madagascar hognose snake (Leioheterodon madagascariensis)C. najae - Red spitting cobra (Naja pallida)C. najadae - Dahl's whip snake (Coluber najadum)C. paraensis - False coral (Oxyrhopus petola digitalis)C. peruensis - Argentine vine snake (Xenoxybelis argenteus)C. psammophi - Brown House Snake (Boaedon fuligenosus), Olive sand snake (Psammophis phillipsi)C. pseustesi - Yellow bellied puffing snake (Pseustes sulphureus sulphureus)C. regentensis - Eastern green mamba (Dendroaspis angusticeps), Western green mamba (Dendroaspis viridis)C. relictae - Florida crowned snake (Tantilla relicta)C. saudiarabiensis - African carpet viper (Echis carinatus)C. serpentis - Madagascar hognose snake (Leioheterodon madagascariensis), Madagascar cat-eye snake (Madagascarophis colubrinus), Madagascar colubrid (Mimophis mahfalensis)C. simplex - Russell's viper (Daboia russelli), Horned viper (Vipera ammodytes), European asp (Vipera aspis), Common European adder (Vipera berus), Kaznakov's viper (Vipera kaznakovi), Palestine viper (Vipera palaestinae), Ottoman viper (Montivipera xanthina xanthina)C. tantillae - Florida crowned snake (Tantilla relicta)C. telescopis - European cat snake (Telescopus fallax)C. veselyi - Long nosed whip snake (Ahaetulla nasuta)C. weyerae - Brown House Snake (Boaedon fuligenosus), Olive sand snake (Psammophis phillipsi)C. zacapensis - Neotropical whip snake (Masticophis mentovarius)

BirdsC. aquilae - Golden eagle (Aquila chrysaetos)C. arcayae - Roadside hawk (Buteo magnirostris), Broad winged hawk (Buteo platypterus)C. argentati - European herring gull (Larus argentatus) C. biarmicusis - Lanner falcon (Falco biarmicus)C. bubonis - Great horned owl (Bubo virginianus)C. circi - Western marsh harrier (Circus aeruginosus)C. falconis - Peregrine falcon (Falco peregrinus), Eurasian hobby (Falco subbuteo), European kestrel (Falco tinnunculus)C. gloriae - Cuban blackbird (Dives atroviolaceus) C. jiroveci - European robin (Erithacus rubecula)C. kansasensis - Swainson's hawk (Buteo swainsoni)C. kutzeri - Lanner falcon (Falco biarmicus), Saker falcon (Falco cherrug), Laggar falcon (Falco jugger), Prairie falcon (Falco mexicanus), Peregrine falcon (Falco peregrinus), Gyrfalcon (Falco rusticolus), Eurasian hobby (Falco subbuteo), European kestrel (Falco tinnunculus)C. lindsayi - Red tailed hawk (Buteo jamaicensis) C. neofalconis - Lanner falcon (Falco biarmicus), Falco mexicanus, Peregrine falcon (Falco peregrinus), Eurasian hobby (Falco subbuteo), European kestrel (Falco tinnunculus)C. strigis - Barn owl (Tyto alba)C. tremula - Turkey vulture (Cathartes aura) C. undata - Tufted puffins (Lunda cirrhata), European herring gull (Larus argentatus), Common murre (Uria aalge aalge) C. uptoni - Red tailed hawk (Buteo jamaicensis borealis)

Other speciesC. cheloniae - Green sea turtle (Chelonia mydas mydas)C. gekkonis - Tokay gecko (Gekko gekko)C. ernsti - Carolina anole (Anolis carolinensis)C. varaniornati - Ornate monitor (Varanus ornatus'')

References

Apicomplexa genera